is a former Japanese Nippon Professional Baseball shortstop. He played for the Hankyu Braves in 1963 and 1965.

External links
Career statistics and player information from Baseball-Reference

1940 births
Living people
Hosei University alumni
Japanese baseball players
Nippon Professional Baseball infielders
Hankyu Braves players